Peter Westenthaler (born "Peter Hojač", 6 November 1967, Vienna) is an Austrian politician. He assumed his mother's maiden name Westenthaler instead of his former surname Hojač (Czech). A member of Jörg Haider's Freedom Party of Austria (FPÖ) up to the so-called "Knittelfeld Putsch" of 2002, he then worked for Frank Stronach's Magna Steyr, and in June 2006 was elected chairman of the newly founded  Alliance for the Future of Austria (BZÖ).

As leader of the BZÖ, Westenthaler was engaged in a heated dispute with FPÖ chairman Heinz-Christian Strache over which of the two political parties is the legal successor to the former FPÖ (the party before the split of 2005 which was a candidate at the 2002 Austrian legislative election).

On 30 August 2008, Peter Westenthaler was officially replaced as chairman of the Alliance for the Future of Austria (BZÖ) by party founder Jörg Haider.

References

1967 births
Living people
Alliance for the Future of Austria politicians